Boy 7 is a 2015 Dutch science fiction film directed by Lourens Blok. The film is based on the eponymous book by Mirjam Mous, but is not a literal adaptation of it. The story is set in a future version of the Netherlands, which have turned into a police state. The story is told in the form of flashbacks. The main roles are played by Matthijs van de Sande Bakhuyzen, Ella-June Henrard and Tygo Gernandt.

See also
 Matthijs van de Sande Bakhuyzen 
 Tygo Gernandt
 Boy 7 (Germany, 2015), a German film based on the same book

External links 
 
 Boy 7 on MovieMeter

2015 films
2010s science fiction thriller films

Dutch science fiction thriller films
2010s Dutch-language films
2010s dystopian films
Films about amnesia
Films based on Dutch novels